Atrichopogon is a genus of biting midges, small flies in the family Ceratopogonidae.

list of species (519) 
 Atrichopogon abrasus
 Atrichopogon abyssiniae
 Atrichopogon acanthocolpus
 Atrichopogon acosmetus
 Atrichopogon adamsoni
 Atrichopogon aereum
 Atrichopogon aethiops
 Atrichopogon africanus
 Atrichopogon akizukii
 Atrichopogon alainus
 Atrichopogon albinensis
 Atrichopogon albiscapula
 Atrichopogon alticola
 Atrichopogon altivolans
 Atrichopogon alveolatus
 Atrichopogon anemotis
 Atrichopogon annulifemoratus
 Atrichopogon appendiculatus
 Atrichopogon aquilonarius
 Atrichopogon archboldi
 Atrichopogon arciforceps
 Atrichopogon arcticus
 Atrichopogon argus
 Atrichopogon argutus
 Atrichopogon aridus
 Atrichopogon armaticaudalis
 Atrichopogon armatilabrum
 Atrichopogon arti
 Atrichopogon assuetus
 Atrichopogon asuturus
 Atrichopogon aterrimus
 Atrichopogon atratus
 Atrichopogon atribarba
 Atrichopogon atricollis
 Atrichopogon atriscapula
 Atrichopogon atromaculatus
 Atrichopogon atroscutellatus
 Atrichopogon atroxipes
 Atrichopogon attentus
 Atrichopogon auricoma
 Atrichopogon australis
 Atrichopogon badiensis
 Atrichopogon bai
 Atrichopogon bakeri
 Atrichopogon balseiroi
 Atrichopogon bangqiensis
 Atrichopogon barbatus
 Atrichopogon bargaensis
 Atrichopogon baripenis
 Atrichopogon beccus
 Atrichopogon bellicosus
 Atrichopogon bessa
 Atrichopogon biangulus
 Atrichopogon bicolor
 Atrichopogon bicuspis
 Atrichopogon bidaculus
 Atrichopogon bifasciatus
 Atrichopogon bifidus
 Atrichopogon binipenis
 Atrichopogon biroi
 Atrichopogon bisetosus
 Atrichopogon boharti
 Atrichopogon borkenti
 Atrichopogon brasiliensis
 Atrichopogon brevicellula
 Atrichopogon brevicercus
 Atrichopogon brevicornis
 Atrichopogon brevifurca
 Atrichopogon brevipalpalis
 Atrichopogon brevipalpis
 Atrichopogon brevipenis
 Atrichopogon breviserra
 Atrichopogon brevistilus
 Atrichopogon briani
 Atrichopogon brunnicellula
 Atrichopogon brunnipes
 Atrichopogon bulla
 Atrichopogon calcuttensis
 Atrichopogon callipotami
 Atrichopogon capistratus
 Atrichopogon caribbeanus
 Atrichopogon carinatus
 Atrichopogon carnatus
 Atrichopogon carpinteroi
 Atrichopogon casali
 Atrichopogon catinus
 Atrichopogon celibatus
 Atrichopogon celsus
 Atrichopogon characapodus
 Atrichopogon chazeaui
 Atrichopogon chilensis
 Atrichopogon chrysosphaerotus
 Atrichopogon chuanxiensis
 Atrichopogon circatheca
 Atrichopogon clarusaliger
 Atrichopogon clastrieri
 Atrichopogon clavator
 Atrichopogon clavifuscus
 Atrichopogon colossus
 Atrichopogon columbianus
 Atrichopogon comatus
 Atrichopogon comechingon
 Atrichopogon conglomeratus
 Atrichopogon conspicuus
 Atrichopogon coracinus
 Atrichopogon corpulentus
 Atrichopogon costalis
 Atrichopogon costaricae
 Atrichopogon costatus
 Atrichopogon cretensis
 Atrichopogon crinitus
 Atrichopogon crispantis
 Atrichopogon cristatus
 Atrichopogon cryptogamus
 Atrichopogon curtipalpis
 Atrichopogon daleyae
 Atrichopogon dehiscentis
 Atrichopogon dekeyseri
 Atrichopogon delpontei
 Atrichopogon densipluma
 Atrichopogon depilis
 Atrichopogon deyrupi
 Atrichopogon diandrous
 Atrichopogon didymothecae
 Atrichopogon diluta
 Atrichopogon discors
 Atrichopogon distinctus
 Atrichopogon domizii
 Atrichopogon dorsalis
 Atrichopogon downesi
 Atrichopogon dubius
 Atrichopogon echinatus
 Atrichopogon echinodes
 Atrichopogon edentatus
 Atrichopogon edwardsi
 Atrichopogon elektrophaeus
 Atrichopogon endemicus
 Atrichopogon epicautae
 Atrichopogon epixanthopygus
 Atrichopogon eucnemus
 Atrichopogon exiletergitus
 Atrichopogon eximiunguis
 Atrichopogon ezoensis
 Atrichopogon falcatus
 Atrichopogon falcis
 Atrichopogon farri
 Atrichopogon femoralis
 Atrichopogon fenestriscutum
 Atrichopogon ferenudus
 Atrichopogon fiebrigi
 Atrichopogon fimbriatus
 Atrichopogon fitzroyi
 Atrichopogon flabellis
 Atrichopogon flavenicruris
 Atrichopogon flavens
 Atrichopogon flaveolus
 Atrichopogon flavicaudae
 Atrichopogon flaviceps
 Atrichopogon flavidus
 Atrichopogon flavipalpis
 Atrichopogon flavipes
 Atrichopogon flavipluma
 Atrichopogon flaviscapus
 Atrichopogon flaviscutellum
 Atrichopogon flavitarsatus
 Atrichopogon flavitergum
 Atrichopogon flavolineatus
 Atrichopogon flavus
 Atrichopogon flumineus
 Atrichopogon forcipatus
 Atrichopogon fulvipes
 Atrichopogon fulviscutellaris
 Atrichopogon fulvus
 Atrichopogon fusciscutellum
 Atrichopogon fusculus
 Atrichopogon fuscus
 Atrichopogon fusinervis
 Atrichopogon gamboai
 Atrichopogon geminus
 Atrichopogon ghashmi
 Atrichopogon gillipaludosus
 Atrichopogon gilvus
 Atrichopogon glaber
 Atrichopogon glabricollis
 Atrichopogon globosus
 Atrichopogon globulifer
 Atrichopogon glukhovae
 Atrichopogon gordoni
 Atrichopogon gracilis
 Atrichopogon grandis
 Atrichopogon granditergitus
 Atrichopogon granditibialis
 Atrichopogon gressitti
 Atrichopogon greyi
 Atrichopogon griseolus
 Atrichopogon guianensis
 Atrichopogon guttatus
 Atrichopogon haemorrhoidalis
 Atrichopogon haesitans
 Atrichopogon harpagonum
 Atrichopogon harrisi
 Atrichopogon helles
 Atrichopogon hesperius
 Atrichopogon hexastichus
 Atrichopogon hilaris
 Atrichopogon hirsutipennis
 Atrichopogon hirtidorsum
 Atrichopogon hispaniae
 Atrichopogon hobsoni
 Atrichopogon homofacies
 Atrichopogon homoius
 Atrichopogon horni
 Atrichopogon horos
 Atrichopogon hortensis
 Atrichopogon hukengicus
 Atrichopogon humicola
 Atrichopogon hystricoides
 Atrichopogon ilonae
 Atrichopogon impensus
 Atrichopogon inacayali
 Atrichopogon inconspicuus
 Atrichopogon incultus
 Atrichopogon indianus
 Atrichopogon infamis
 Atrichopogon infuscus
 Atrichopogon insignipalpis
 Atrichopogon insigniunguis
 Atrichopogon insigniventris
 Atrichopogon insolens
 Atrichopogon insolitipes
 Atrichopogon insularis
 Atrichopogon intertextus
 Atrichopogon isis
 Atrichopogon isolatus
 Atrichopogon jacobsoni
 Atrichopogon jamnbacki
 Atrichopogon japonicus
 Atrichopogon javieri
 Atrichopogon jejunus
 Atrichopogon jianfengensis
 Atrichopogon jubacaudalis
 Atrichopogon kagiensis
 Atrichopogon kangnani
 Atrichopogon kelainosoma
 Atrichopogon kribiensis
 Atrichopogon kyotoensis
 Atrichopogon lacajae
 Atrichopogon lacustris
 Atrichopogon ladislavi
 Atrichopogon lamellamarsipos
 Atrichopogon lampronotus
 Atrichopogon largipenis
 Atrichopogon lassus
 Atrichopogon latipygus
 Atrichopogon lazoensis
 Atrichopogon levis
 Atrichopogon lindneri
 Atrichopogon lituratus
 Atrichopogon lobatus
 Atrichopogon longicalcar
 Atrichopogon longicalcaris
 Atrichopogon longicornis
 Atrichopogon longicosta
 Atrichopogon longipalpis
 Atrichopogon longirostris
 Atrichopogon longiserra
 Atrichopogon longitergitus
 Atrichopogon lucorum
 Atrichopogon ludingensis
 Atrichopogon luteicollis
 Atrichopogon luteipes
 Atrichopogon lutescens
 Atrichopogon lyratus
 Atrichopogon macrodentatum
 Atrichopogon maculatus
 Atrichopogon maculipennis
 Atrichopogon maculosus
 Atrichopogon magnus
 Atrichopogon marginipilus
 Atrichopogon maritimus
 Atrichopogon mastersi
 Atrichopogon matilei
 Atrichopogon medicrinis
 Atrichopogon megalotheca
 Atrichopogon melancholicus
 Atrichopogon melanimus
 Atrichopogon melanoticus
 Atrichopogon melinois
 Atrichopogon meloesugans
 Atrichopogon mendozae
 Atrichopogon mexicanus
 Atrichopogon minimus
 Atrichopogon minutalatus
 Atrichopogon minutus
 Atrichopogon miripalpis
 Atrichopogon modestus
 Atrichopogon monomorphicus
 Atrichopogon monticola
 Atrichopogon montigenum
 Atrichopogon montium
 Atrichopogon montivagus
 Atrichopogon muelleri
 Atrichopogon multidens
 Atrichopogon multiplex
 Atrichopogon multispinosa
 Atrichopogon myrmedon
 Atrichopogon nahuelbutensis
 Atrichopogon nanus
 Atrichopogon natalensis
 Atrichopogon natans
 Atrichopogon nebulosus
 Atrichopogon nemestrinus
 Atrichopogon neocaledoniensis
 Atrichopogon nielamuensis
 Atrichopogon nigeriae
 Atrichopogon nigribasalis
 Atrichopogon nigripes
 Atrichopogon nigritellus
 Atrichopogon nigrithoracius
 Atrichopogon nigrithorax
 Atrichopogon nigrofuscus
 Atrichopogon nigromicans
 Atrichopogon nilicola
 Atrichopogon niloticus
 Atrichopogon nilssoni
 Atrichopogon novaeteutoniae
 Atrichopogon novaguinensis
 Atrichopogon nubeculosus
 Atrichopogon nudus
 Atrichopogon obesus
 Atrichopogon obfuscatus
 Atrichopogon obnubilus
 Atrichopogon obscuripes
 Atrichopogon obscurus
 Atrichopogon occidentalis
 Atrichopogon ochrosoma
 Atrichopogon ocumare
 Atrichopogon oedemerarum
 Atrichopogon okinawensis
 Atrichopogon ollicula
 Atrichopogon orbicularis
 Atrichopogon orbitus
 Atrichopogon origenus
 Atrichopogon oriphilus
 Atrichopogon ornatipennis
 Atrichopogon ornatithorax
 Atrichopogon ornativentris
 Atrichopogon osiris
 Atrichopogon oviformis
 Atrichopogon pachycnemus
 Atrichopogon pacificus
 Atrichopogon pallidicillus
 Atrichopogon pallidipedis
 Atrichopogon pallidipes
 Atrichopogon palmatus
 Atrichopogon palpalis
 Atrichopogon palus
 Atrichopogon parroti
 Atrichopogon parvulus
 Atrichopogon pastinaca
 Atrichopogon paulus
 Atrichopogon pavidus
 Atrichopogon pecteniventris
 Atrichopogon pectinatus
 Atrichopogon peculiaris
 Atrichopogon pedipalens
 Atrichopogon penicillatus
 Atrichopogon peregrinus
 Atrichopogon perfuscus
 Atrichopogon perplexus
 Atrichopogon peruvianus
 Atrichopogon petrosus
 Atrichopogon phusunensis
 Atrichopogon piceiventris
 Atrichopogon picipes
 Atrichopogon pictipennis
 Atrichopogon pileolus
 Atrichopogon planetus
 Atrichopogon planusunguis
 Atrichopogon poguei
 Atrichopogon polita
 Atrichopogon postremus
 Atrichopogon pruinosus
 Atrichopogon psilopterus
 Atrichopogon pterygospinous
 Atrichopogon pudicus
 Atrichopogon pullatus
 Atrichopogon pusillus
 Atrichopogon quadratepenis
 Atrichopogon quadrisetosus
 Atrichopogon quartibrunneus
 Atrichopogon quasicomatus
 Atrichopogon quateriharpagonum
 Atrichopogon raripilipennis
 Atrichopogon redactus
 Atrichopogon remigatus
 Atrichopogon rhiphidius
 Atrichopogon rhynchops
 Atrichopogon rictus
 Atrichopogon rivalis
 Atrichopogon rostratus
 Atrichopogon rotundus
 Atrichopogon ruber
 Atrichopogon rubidus
 Atrichopogon rufescens
 Atrichopogon rufiventris
 Atrichopogon rusticus
 Atrichopogon ryukyuensis
 Atrichopogon sachalinensis
 Atrichopogon salisburiensis
 Atrichopogon sallami
 Atrichopogon sanctaeclarae
 Atrichopogon sanctilaurentii
 Atrichopogon saundersi
 Atrichopogon schizonyx
 Atrichopogon scutatis
 Atrichopogon scutellaris
 Atrichopogon sebessi
 Atrichopogon semipilosus
 Atrichopogon sequax
 Atrichopogon sergioi
 Atrichopogon serrulatus
 Atrichopogon sessilis
 Atrichopogon setosicubitus
 Atrichopogon setosilateralis
 Atrichopogon setosus
 Atrichopogon seudoobfuscatus
 Atrichopogon shortlandi
 Atrichopogon sichotensis
 Atrichopogon similis
 Atrichopogon simplex
 Atrichopogon simplicifurcatus
 Atrichopogon singularis
 Atrichopogon sinuosus
 Atrichopogon snyderi
 Atrichopogon solivagus
 Atrichopogon sordidus
 Atrichopogon spadix
 Atrichopogon spartos
 Atrichopogon speculiger
 Atrichopogon sphagnalis
 Atrichopogon spinicaudalis
 Atrichopogon spiniventris
 Atrichopogon spinosus
 Atrichopogon spurius
 Atrichopogon stannusi
 Atrichopogon subcomatus
 Atrichopogon subfuscus
 Atrichopogon sublimatus
 Atrichopogon subtenuiatus
 Atrichopogon suburbanus
 Atrichopogon sulfuratus
 Atrichopogon sumatrae
 Atrichopogon taeniatus
 Atrichopogon taizi
 Atrichopogon talarum
 Atrichopogon tapantiensis
 Atrichopogon tatricus
 Atrichopogon tegmentalis
 Atrichopogon tenuiatus
 Atrichopogon tenuidentis
 Atrichopogon tenuipalpis
 Atrichopogon tenuistylus
 Atrichopogon tetramischus
 Atrichopogon thersites
 Atrichopogon thienemanni
 Atrichopogon tirzae
 Atrichopogon titanus
 Atrichopogon transiens
 Atrichopogon transversus
 Atrichopogon trichopus
 Atrichopogon trichotomma
 Atrichopogon tricleaves
 Atrichopogon tridentistylus
 Atrichopogon trindadensis
 Atrichopogon tritomus
 Atrichopogon tropicus
 Atrichopogon tuberculatus
 Atrichopogon turneri
 Atrichopogon tutatus
 Atrichopogon udus
 Atrichopogon umbratilis
 Atrichopogon umbrosus
 Atrichopogon unguis
 Atrichopogon unilineatus
 Atrichopogon urbicola
 Atrichopogon uruguayensis
 Atrichopogon utricularius
 Atrichopogon varius
 Atrichopogon vastus
 Atrichopogon vepres
 Atrichopogon verax
 Atrichopogon vesiculosus
 Atrichopogon vestitipennis
 Atrichopogon vicinus
 Atrichopogon victoriae
 Atrichopogon vittatus
 Atrichopogon volaticus
 Atrichopogon wallisensis
 Atrichopogon warmkei
 Atrichopogon websteri
 Atrichopogon winnertzi
 Atrichopogon wirthi
 Atrichopogon woodfordi
 Atrichopogon woodruffi
 Atrichopogon wuyishanicus
 Atrichopogon xanthoaspidium
 Atrichopogon xanthophilus
 Atrichopogon xanthopus
 Atrichopogon xanthopygus
 Atrichopogon xylochus
 Atrichopogon yamabukiensis
 Atrichopogon yolancae
 Atrichopogon yongxinensis
 Atrichopogon yoshimurai
 Atrichopogon zhangmuensis
 †Atrichopogon brunnescens
 †Atrichopogon dominicanus
 †Atrichopogon eocenicus

References

External links 
 
 ION
 Nomenclator Zoologicus

Ceratopogonidae
Lists of Diptera
Lists of insect species